Bruno de Keyzer (11 August 1949 – 25 June 2019) was a French cinematographer.

Biography 
He began his film career as a camera assistant with Sven Nykvist for Black Moon, directed by Louis Malle (1974). He became director of photography in 1982 and worked with renowned filmmakers, including Bertrand Tavernier and Jerry Schatzberg.

He plays as an actor in Très bien, merci, by Emmanuelle Cuau (2007).

He lived in Villerville (Calvados, France).

Filmography
2010 – The Princess of Montpensier
2009 – In the Electric Mist
2008 – Alarm
2007 – Très bien, merci
2006 – Les Européens
2005 – Zaina: Rider of the Atlas
2005 – Avant l'oubli
2001 – J'ai faim !!!
2000 – The Day the Ponies Come Back
2000 – About Adam
1999 – C'est pas ma faute!
1999 – Les collègues
1999 – Shooting the Past
1998 – Le Clone
1998 – The Commissioner
1997 – The Fifth Province
1997 – Mojo
1996 – Victory
1996 – Der Unhold
1996 – North Star
1995 – All Men Are Mortal
1994 – War of the Buttons
1994 – La Reina de la Noche
1992 – Double Vision
1992 – Max & Jeremie
1992 – The Railway Station Man
1991 – Afraid of the Dark
1991 – Impromptu
1991 – December Bride
1987 – Little Dorrit
1986 – The Murders in the Rue Morgue

Awards
Won 1985 César Awards for Best Cinematography – A Sunday in the Country
Nominated 1990 César Awards for Best Cinematography – Life and Nothing But
Nominated 2011 César Awards for Best Cinematography – The Princess of Montpensier
Nominated 1986 Los Angeles Film Critics Associations Awards for Best Cinematography – Round Midnight

References

External links

1949 births
2019 deaths
French cinematographers
People from Eure-et-Loir
Chevaliers of the Ordre des Arts et des Lettres